Daniel Paul Futterman (born June 8, 1967) is an American actor, screenwriter, and producer.

Futterman wrote the screenplay for the film Capote, for which he received an Academy Award nomination, an Independent Spirit, Boston Society of Film Critics, and Los Angeles Film Critics Association awards. He received a second Academy Award nomination for co-writing the script to Foxcatcher in 2014.

Futterman is also known for several acting roles, including Val Goldman in the film The Birdcage, and Vincent Gray on the CBS television series Judging Amy.

Personal life
Futterman, one of three siblings, was born in Silver Spring, Maryland, the son of Linda (née Roth), a psychoanalyst, and Stanley Futterman, a lawyer. He was raised in Conservative Judaism in an "intellectual family". Futterman grew up in Larchmont, New York, and graduated from Mamaroneck High School in 1985 and Columbia University in 1989.

Futterman is married to television writer and producer Anya Epstein (sister of baseball executive Theo Epstein and granddaughter of Philip G. Epstein, Academy Award-winning screenwriter of Casablanca), with whom he has two daughters.

Acting career
In 1991, Futterman landed his first stage role in the WPA production Club Soda. He also succeeded Joe Mantello as the voluble Louis Ironson in Tony Kushner's Tony award-winning play Angels in America on Broadway in 1993. Futterman portrayed an American diplomat's son who runs into trouble in South Africa in Jon Robin Baitz's A Fair Country (1996). He portrayed a slick card player with big dreams in Dealer's Choice (1997).

Futterman's first film role was as a thug who menaces Robin Williams in The Fisher King (1991). He appeared as a teacher in the romantic comedy Breathing Room/'Til Christmas (1996). Far Harbor/Mr. Spreckman's Boat (also 1996) was an ensemble piece which featured Futterman as a smarmy doctor in an interracial relationship. Also in 1996 he played Val, the son of gay lovers and nightclub owners Albert and Armand (again with Robin Williams) in The Birdcage. He also appeared as the American half of a pair of twenty-something con artists in London in Shooting Fish (1997). He also had the leading role as a befuddled young gay man seeking for his missing lover in the NYC-based award-winning drama/thriller Urbania. He played "Joe" in the 2002 film Enough, with Jennifer Lopez. Futterman's most recent film is A Mighty Heart (2007) with Angelina Jolie; he portrays murdered journalist Daniel Pearl.

Futterman has also made several guest appearances in primetime television. He costarred with Mickey Rourke as a teacher who clashes with a priest in Thicker Than Blood (TNT, 1998) and appeared alongside Ron Eldard and Martin Donovan in the World War II drama When Trumpets Fade (HBO, 1998). In 1999, Futterman made the leap to series TV, co-starring as the brother of the central character on the CBS series Judging Amy. Futterman also had a recurring role as the on-again, off-again boyfriend of one of the four sisters (Kiele Sanchez) on The WB drama Related. He also guest-starred in a four-episode story arc on the sitcom Will & Grace. Futterman was slated to appear in a recurring role on the new ABC drama Brothers & Sisters, also written by Jon Robin Baitz, but bowed out due to scheduling conflicts. He filmed an appearance alongside former "Birdcage" costar Calista Flockhart playing her fiancée, but that version of the pilot underwent massive rewrites and never aired. Previously he also played a metrosexual man (pastry chef Stephan) on Sex and the City.

In 2012, he had a recurring role on the USA series Political Animals.

Writing career
Futterman wrote the screenplay for Capote, and Futterman's friend Bennett Miller directed the film. Futterman and Miller graduated together from Mamaroneck High School and have been friends since 7th grade. The two recruited another old friend, actor Philip Seymour Hoffman, to star as Truman Capote, and began the process of getting the independent film made. Futterman and Hoffman were Executive Producers of the film. Futterman was recognized with several award nominations, including an Oscar nod for Best Adapted Screenplay.

In 2007, Futterman stated that he would focus on his writing career, and was adapting the novel Everything Changes into a film script for Columbia Pictures.

From 2007 to 2010, Futterman and Epstein were writers and executive producers for the HBO drama series In Treatment.

In late 2009, Futterman and Epstein were in development with HBO to write and executive-produce a half-hour drama series called "T" about a trans man going through gender transition; it is based on a story from the radio show This American Life, and Ira Glass and Alissa Shipp of This American Life were slated to be executive producers as well. The series, scheduled as part of SundanceTV's 2013–2014 lineup, was to be written by Futterman and his wife, Anya Epstein.

Futterman, with E. Max Frye, wrote the screenplay for another Miller-directed film, Foxcatcher (2014), a biographical drama film starring Steve Carell, Channing Tatum, and Mark Ruffalo. He and Frye were nominated for Best Original Screenplay at the 87th Academy Awards.

Producing career
Futterman not only writes and acts in movies and on television, but often co-produces these projects as well. He has frequently written scripts and executive produced alongside his wife, such as on the HBO series In Treatment. Futterman also adapted and produced a ten-part series for Fox, Gracepoint. Futterman, Lawrence Wright and Alex Gibney are executive producers of The Looming Tower for Hulu in 2018. He is the showrunner of the 2021 Showtime series American Rust.

Filmography

References

External links

1967 births
Male actors from Maryland
Male actors from New York City
American male film actors
American male screenwriters
American male stage actors
American male television actors
Columbia College (New York) alumni
Independent Spirit Award winners
Living people
Outstanding Performance by a Cast in a Motion Picture Screen Actors Guild Award winners
People from Silver Spring, Maryland
People from Larchmont, New York
Alumni of the British American Drama Academy
Screenwriters from New York (state)
Screenwriters from Maryland
Mamaroneck High School alumni
21st-century American screenwriters
21st-century American male writers
20th-century American male actors
21st-century American male actors